Andrey Kudriashov (born July 10, 1991) is a Russian speedway rider who ride for KMŻ Lublin in the Polish First League (second division).

Career history

2009
Andrey Kudriashov was won Individual Under-19 Russian Champion title scoring 15 points maximum score. Kudryashov finishing third at Individual Under-21 Russian Championship scoring 12 points.

On September 3, 2009, Kudryashov  started in the motoAllegro Szlaka Piastowska, individual meeting in Poznań, Poland. Andrey scoring 2 points and finishing 15th.

2010
Kudriashov is starting in the 2011 Speedway Grand Prix Qualification. In Qualifying Round Four scoring 7 points and finishing 8th and was won qualify to the Race-Off.

Andrey Kudriashov started in 2010 Individual Speedway Junior World Championship Qualifying Round Three in Gdańsk, Poland and won qualify to the Semi-Final Two on June 26 in Landshut, Germany.

Andrey started in the 2010 Individual Speedway Junior European Championship, but in the Semi-Final One in Rawicz, Poland finishing 7th and was knocked out of the competition.

Career details

World Championships
 Individual U-21 World Championship (Under-21 World Championship)
 2010 - qualify to the Semi-Final

European Championships
 Individual Under-19 European Championship
 2010 - 7th placed in the Semi-Final One

Domestic competitions
 Team Polish Championship (Polish league)
 2010 - Second League for Kraków
 2021 - First League for Kolejarz Opole
 Individual Under-21 Russian Championship
 2009 -  - Tolyatti - 3rd placed (12 pts)

See also
 Russia national under-21 speedway team (under-19)

References

External links
 (Polish) Andrey Kudryashov' articles at SportoweFakty.pl

1991 births
Living people
Russian speedway riders